The seventeenth season of NCIS, an American police procedural drama television series, originally aired on CBS from September 24, 2019 through April 14, 2020. The season was produced by Belisarius Productions and CBS Television Studios. The season contained 20 episodes, due to the COVID-19 pandemic.

NCIS revolves around a fictional team of special agents from the Naval Criminal Investigative Service, which conducts criminal investigations involving the U.S. Navy and Marine Corps.

In May 2020, CBS renewed the series for an eighteenth season.

Cast and characters

Main
 Mark Harmon as Leroy Jethro Gibbs, NCIS Supervisory Special Agent (SSA) of the Major Case Response Team (MCRT) assigned to Washington's Navy Yard 
 Sean Murray as Timothy McGee, NCIS Senior Special Agent, second in command of MCRT
 Wilmer Valderrama as Nick Torres, NCIS Special Agent
 Emily Wickersham as Eleanor "Ellie" Bishop, NCIS Special Agent
 Maria Bello as Dr. Jacqueline "Jack" Sloane, NCIS Senior Resident Agent and Operational Psychologist
 Brian Dietzen as Dr. Jimmy Palmer, Chief Medical Examiner for NCIS
 Diona Reasonover as Kasie Hines, Forensic Specialist for NCIS
 Rocky Carroll as Leon Vance, NCIS Director
 David McCallum as Dr. Donald "Ducky" Mallard, NCIS Historian and former Chief Medical Examiner

Recurring
 Cote de Pablo as Ziva David, former Mossad Officer and former NCIS Special Agent
 Laura San Giacomo as Dr. Grace Confalone, psychotherapist
 Megan Gallagher as Jennifer Leo, Under Secretary of the Navy
 Don Lake as Phillip Brooks, Navy Captain
 Louise Barnes as Mira Sahar Azam / Sarah, Gibbs's neighbor and terrorist
 Mouzam Makkar as fake Mira Sahar Azam
 Jack Fisher as Phineas, Sarah's son
 Usman Ally as Victor Mir, NCIS target
 Damon Dayoub as Adam Eshel, Mossad Agent
 Elayn J. Taylor as Odette Malone, owner of Ziva's private office and former CIA Operative
 Kate Hamilton as Faith Tolliver, Jack Sloane's biological daughter
 Karri Turner as Micki Kaydar, Phineas' aunt

Guest
 Devale Ellis as Dante Brown, Kasie's childhood best friend
 Patrick Duffy as Jack Briggs, retired Navy Lieutenant Commander
 Kevin Kilner as Patrick Norian, NSA Access Manager
 Lisa LoCicero as Elena Devol, Torres's girlfriend
 Camryn Grimes as Laney Alimonte, Marine Corporal
 Ellen Geer as Esther Daniels
 Daphne Zuniga as Stacy Gordon, Navy Commander
 Christopher Lloyd as Joseph "Joe" Smith

Episodes

Production
NCIS was renewed for a seventeenth season on April 11, 2019. 

On March 13, 2020, CBS announced that the filming of season 17 had been suspended due to the COVID-19 pandemic. Storylines planned for what would have been Episodes 21-24 are confirmed to have been integrated into the Season 18 episodes "Everything Starts Somewhere" and "Sunburn." Executive producer Frank Cardea teased a "very surprising ending" that was altered due to the pandemic. Fans have speculated that this was either the exit of Maria Bello's Jacqueline Sloane (which was postponed until the Season 18 episode "True Believer") or an on-screen reunion of former main cast members Michael Weatherly and Cote de Pablo as Tony DiNozzo and Ziva David, though neither theory was confirmed.

This is the first season not to feature Joe Spano in his recurring role as Tobias Fornell, though he is mentioned numerous times in the season's eighth episode, "Musical Chairs." The fact that the opening arc of the next season would conclude the episode's arc regarding Fornell and his daughter, which began in the Season 16 finale, has led to speculation that this story was intended to be the basis for the unproduced final episode of Season 17.

Broadcast
The seventeenth season of NCIS premiered on September 24, 2019.

Ratings

References

External links
 
 

2019 American television seasons
2020 American television seasons
NCIS 17
Television productions suspended due to the COVID-19 pandemic